Transom may refer to:
 Transom (architecture), a bar of wood or stone across the top of a door or window, or the window above such a bar
 Transom (nautical), that part of the stern of a vessel where the two sides of its hull meet
 Operation Transom, a World War II bombing raid on Surabaya in Java
 Transom knot, a simple lashing knot
 Tug Transom, a British daily comic strip